Bird-Brains (stylized as BiRd-BrAiNs) is the debut album by American lo-fi musician Merrill Garbus' project Tune-Yards. It was originally released as a Compact Cassette on Marriage Records on June 9, 2009, and was re-released on August 17 by 4AD as a limited-edition pressing. It was released worldwide on November 16, 2009, with two bonus tracks.

The album was recorded almost exclusively by Garbus on a hand recorder and mixed using Audacity. Speaking to Charlotte Richardson Andrews of The Guardian, she noted her instrumental limitations and how they led to a dependence on percussion: "I had no bass – literally, I didn't own one – so the drums had to be big."

Critical reception 

Pitchfork ranked Bird-Brains at number 44 on their list of the top 50 albums of 2009.

Track listing

The vinyl edition does not include the track "" and instead ends with "Fiya".

References

External links
 
  Tune-Yards at 4AD
 

2009 debut albums
4AD albums
Tune-Yards albums
Marriage Records albums